The Khatanga Gulf or Khatanga Bay is a large tidal estuary in the Laptev Sea.

Geography
The Bolshoy Begichev Island divides the gulf into two straits: Northern Strait ( wide) and Eastern Strait ( wide). The Khatanga River and the Popigay River flow out into the Khatanga Gulf. The shores of the gulf are high, steep, and indented. The Khatanga Gulf is covered with ice most of the year.

The shores of the Khatanga Bay are generally raised, consisting of low tundra cliffs, as well as sandstone and mudstone cliffs and sedimentation areas.

Since the administrative border cuts across this area, the northern and western parts of the Khatanga Bay belong to the Krasnoyarsk Krai, while its southeastern side belongs to the Sakha administrative region of the Russian Federation.

The former settlement and penal colony of Nordvik was located by a north-facing bay on the Eastern Strait of the Khatanga Gulf known as Bukhta Nordvik.

References 

 Khatanga settlement & Taymyr area information and pictures: 
 Oil and gas exploration
 Ethnography
 History
 Neolithic Age: 
 Birds in the Khatanga Bay area: 

Estuaries of Russia
Bodies of water of the Laptev Sea
Bodies of water of Krasnoyarsk Krai
Bodies of water of the Sakha Republic